The Zymer Musiqi House is a cultural heritage monument in Cecelija, Vushtrri, Kosovo.

History
The house, which was once the property of the Musiqi and Mulaku families, is located in a village named after Saint Cecilia, registered within the Sanjak of Vushtrri as Çeçelije in the 1537 defter of the Eyalet of Rumelia. Several beys from Vushtrri settled here, founding the Berisha that predominates in the area today. A craftsman named Dibran is held in local folklore to have built the house as one of the first of its kind and the first school in the region in the early 17th century.

The house was built of stone and wood with a straw-based mortar. The roof is tile and stretches out into a 1-m awning. There are two entrances, one northward and one southward, with an interior staircase connecting both to the three bedrooms, living room, hearth, hallway, and bathrooms inside. The south side featured a divan for summer gatherings.

See also 
 Sanjak of Viçitrina
 List of monuments in Vushtrri

References

External links 
 Vushtrri Municipality (Official Website)

Historic sites in Kosovo
Cultural heritage monuments in Vushtrri